Margaret Ritchie may refer to:
Margaret Ritchie (soprano), English soprano
Margaret Ritchie, Baroness Ritchie of Downpatrick, Northern Ireland politician
Meg Ritchie, born Margaret Ritchie, Scottish discus thrower